The 121st Street station is a skip-stop station on the elevated BMT Jamaica Line of the New York City Subway. Located at the intersection of 121st Street and Jamaica Avenue in Richmond Hill and Kew Gardens, Queens, it is served by the Z train during rush hours in the peak direction and the J train at all other times.

History 
This station was opened on July 3, 1918 by the Brooklyn Union Elevated Railroad, an affiliate of the Brooklyn Rapid Transit Company.

During construction of the Archer Avenue Line, the Jamaica Avenue elevated line was cut back past 121st Street on April 15, 1985. Until the opening of the Archer Avenue Line in 1988, J trains alternately terminated at 111th Street and 121st Street, with peak period headways to 121st Street being ten minutes. This temporary service pattern was originally slated to be in effect for six or seven months. Construction on the ramps to Archer Avenue was completed in November 1987, but since the tunnels were not ready for service until 1988, a double crossover east (railroad north) of the station was installed while the ramps were used for storage.

The Manhattan-bound platform closed for renovations on February 6, 2017 and reopened on December 22, 2017, delayed from the summer. The Jamaica Center-bound platform closed for renovations on February 12, 2018 and reopened on November 14, 2018, delayed from its planned reopening in the summer.

Station layout

This elevated station has two tracks and two side platforms, with space for a center express track that was never added. The station has beige windscreens and green canopies. This is the easternmost station on the Jamaica Line, east of here, trains go underground to the BMT Archer Avenue Line.

Exits
There are two exits. The full-time exit is at the west (railroad south) end of the station. One staircase from each platform leads to the mezzanine beneath the tracks. Outside of fare control, a pair of staircases lead down to either side of Jamaica Avenue on the west side of 121st Street.

There is an additional unstaffed exit at the east (railroad north) end of the station leading to the west side of 123rd Street. This exit is split in half due to the closed-off station house beneath the tracks. A single staircase from each platform leads to a landing that contains a full-height HEET turnstile before the street stairs.

References

External links 

 
 Station Reporter — J Train
 The Subway Nut — 121st Street Pictures 
 121st Street entrance from Google Maps Street View
 123rd Street entrance from Google Maps Street View
Platforms from Google Maps Street View

BMT Jamaica Line stations
New York City Subway stations in Queens, New York
Railway stations in the United States opened in 1918
Richmond Hill, Queens
1918 establishments in New York City